David Allen Carter (born March 12, 1967) is an American college basketball coach who is an assistant coach at Loyola Marymount University.

From 1999 to 2009, Carter was an assistant at the University of Nevada, Reno, under Trent Johnson from 1999 to 2004 and Mark Fox from 2004 to 2009, including as associate head coach beginning in 2005.

On April 3, 2009, Carter became head coach after Fox left to become head coach at Georgia.

Carter was fired by the University of Nevada, Reno in March 2015. In June, Carter re-joined Saint Mary's as assistant coach, this time under Randy Bennett. Carter was an assistant at Saint Mary's from 1997 to 1999 under Dave Bollwinkel.

On June 7, 2017, Carter was once again hired by Fox as an assistant coach, this time for Georgia, replacing former assistant Yasir Rosemond. After Fox was fired at the end of the season, Carter was not retained under new head coach Tom Crean.

On June 11, 2018, Carter was hired by San Diego as assistant coach under Sam Scholl.

On April 8, 2020, Carter was announced as a part of Stan Johnson's first coaching staff at Loyola Marymount.

Head coaching record

References

1967 births
Living people
Basketball coaches from California
Basketball players from Los Angeles
College men's basketball head coaches in the United States
Eastern Washington Eagles men's basketball coaches
Junior college men's basketball coaches in the United States
Nevada Wolf Pack men's basketball coaches
Place of birth missing (living people)
Point guards
Saint Mary's Gaels men's basketball coaches
Saint Mary's Gaels men's basketball players
American men's basketball players